Arber Haliti (born 25 January 1992) is an Albanian football player who most recently played for KF Laçi in the Albanian Superliga.

Honours
KF Laçi
 Albanian Cup (2): 2012–13, 2014–15

References

1992 births
Living people
People from Krujë
Association football forwards
Albanian footballers
KF Laçi players
Kategoria Superiore players